The International Union for Conservation of Nature (IUCN) lists 35 extinct species, 146 possibly extinct species, two extinct in the wild species, and one possibly extinct in the wild species of amphibians.

Salamanders

Extinct species

Possibly extinct species

Frogs

Extinct species

Possibly extinct species

Extinct in the wild species
Wyoming toad (Anaxyrus baxteri)
Longnose stubfoot toad (Atelopus longirostris)
Kihansi spray toad (Nectophrynoides asperginis)

See also 
 List of least concern amphibians
 List of near threatened amphibians
 List of vulnerable amphibians
 List of endangered amphibians
 List of critically endangered amphibians
 List of data deficient amphibians

References 

Amphibians
Recently extinct amphibians
Recently extinct amphibians